Centelles is a municipality in the comarca of Osona in 
Catalonia, Spain. It is situated in the upper valley of the Congost River in the south of the 
comarca. The municipality is served by the C-17 road. The renowned urban planner Ildefons Cerdà was born here.

Main sights
Chapel of Jesus (16th century)
Chapel of the Rescue (16th century)
City Portal (1542), the ancient entrance to the town
Counts' Palace Palau (16th century). It houses a Palaeontology museum.
Hermitage of Sant Antoni de les Codines
Parish church of Santa Coloma (1704-1710). The bell tower is from   1682.

References

 Panareda Clopés, Josep Maria; Rios Calvet, Jaume; Rabella Vives, Josep Maria (1989). Guia de Catalunya, Barcelona: Caixa de Catalunya.  (Spanish).  (Catalan).

External links

Official website 
 Government data pages 

Municipalities in Osona